Lu Xinshe (born November 1956) is a Chinese politician who served as Communist Party Secretary of Guangxi Zhuang Autonomous Region from 2018 to 2021. Prior to becoming Guangxi party chief, he was Governor of Jiangxi from 2011 to 2016, and Communist Party Secretary of Jiangxi from 2016 to 2018.

Career
Lu Xinshe was born in Juye County, Shandong province.  After the Cultural Revolution, he attended the Wuhan Hydraulics and Power College (now folded into Wuhan University).  In 1982, he worked for the national ministry of agriculture and fisheries. He joined the Chinese Communist Party in July 1985.  From 1986 to 1996 he worked for the State Administration of National Land (later Ministry of Land and Resources).  He was sent to study in West Germany from 1987 to 1988, and temporarily took the post of vice mayor of Nantong, Jiangsu from 1995 to 1996.  From 1999 until 2011 he was a Deputy Minister of Land and Resources.

In June 2011 he was transferred to Jiangxi province to become its acting governor, and was officially elected as governor in February 2012. On June 29, 2016, he replaced Qiang Wei as Communist Party Secretary of Jiangxi. On March 21, 2018, Lu was appointed as the Communist Party Secretary of Guangxi, replacing Peng Qinghua.

Lu Xinshe was an alternate member of the 17th Central Committee and is a full member of the 18th Central Committee of the Chinese Communist Party.

On 23 October 2021, he was appointed vice chairperson of the National People's Congress Agriculture and Rural Affairs Committee.

References

Living people
1956 births
Governors of Jiangxi
Chinese Communist Party politicians from Shandong
People's Republic of China politicians from Shandong
Political office-holders in Jiangsu
Wuhan University alumni
Politicians from Heze
Members of the 19th Central Committee of the Chinese Communist Party
Members of the 18th Central Committee of the Chinese Communist Party
Alternate members of the 17th Central Committee of the Chinese Communist Party
Delegates to the 13th National People's Congress
Delegates to the 11th National People's Congress